Albert Herman "Ab" Sluis (born 26 November 1937) is a retired Dutch road cyclist. In 1960 he won the Ronde van Noord-Holland and finished in fourth place in the 100 km team time trial at the 1960 Summer Olympics.

See also
 List of Dutch Olympic cyclists

References

External links
 

1937 births
Living people
Dutch male cyclists
Olympic cyclists of the Netherlands
Cyclists at the 1960 Summer Olympics
People from Haarlemmermeer
Cyclists from North Holland